Zaskia Adya Mecca (born September 8, 1987) is an Indonesian actress and presenter of Sunda-Aceh-German descent. She is married to movie director Hanung Bramantyo and the oldest sister of an actors Haykal Kamil and Marsha Natika, and a younger sister-in-law of actor Ferry Ardiansyah.

Career
Zaskia started her career as a model, winning second place in Model Kawanku in 2001. She was subsequently offered supporting roles in the soap operas Senandung Masa Puber and Cinta SMU.

Zaskia starred in the soap opera Kiamat Sudah Dekat, directed by Deddy Mizwar. She has also appeared in Cinta SMU, Senandung Masa Puber, Lorong Waktu, Munajah Cinta,  Aqso dan Madina, Dibalik Jilbab Zaskia, and Para Pencari Tuhan, Seasons 1–6.

The end of December 2006, Zaskia starred in the television film on TVRI entitled Ibunda, directed by Rudi Imam. In 2007, Zaskia she appeared in the religious films Kun Fayakuun and Ayat-Ayat Cinta, based on the novel of the same name by Habiburrahman El Shirazy. She has also appeared in Doa Yang Mengancam  and Sang Pencerah..

Personal life
On September 14, 2009, Zaskia married Hanung Bramantyo. They have five children.

Filmography

Film

Television

Awards and nominations

References

External links
  https://web.archive.org/web/20070929111043/http://www.kompas.co.id/gayahidup/news/0511/08/115129.htm
  https://web.archive.org/web/20080813153330/http://citizennews.suaramerdeka.com:80/index.php?option=com_content&task=view&id=309&Itemid=71

1987 births
Acehnese people
Indonesian film actresses
Indonesian television actresses
Living people
Sundanese people
Indo people
21st-century Indonesian actresses
Indonesian people of German descent
Indonesian Muslims